Mount Wilder is a  mountain summit located near the head of the Elwha Valley, deep within Olympic National Park in Jefferson County of Washington state. Part of the Olympic Mountains, Wilder represents the southernmost peak of the Bailey Range. It is situated 8.7 miles east-southeast of Mount Olympus, and is set within the Daniel J. Evans Wilderness. Neighbors include line parent Mount Dana, 2.3 miles (3.7 km) to the northeast, and Mount Seattle rises 3.7 miles to the southwest. The headwaters of the Goldie River form on the south slope of the mountain, and precipitation runoff from the mountain drains into Goldie River and other tributaries of the Elwha River. Topographic relief is significant as the south aspect of the peak rises nearly 3,800 feet (1,160 m) in less than two miles.

History

This mountain was originally christened "Mt. Barnes" by the 1889-90 Seattle Press Expedition, for Charles Adams Barnes, the expedition's topographer. In December 1889, he and James Halbold Christie, the leader of the expedition, climbed through deep snow to the ridge just north of the peak, and finally laid eyes on the interior of the range which had been a mystery. Barnes wrote of the spectacle: "Range after range of peaks, snow-clad from base to summit, extended as far as the eye could reach, in splendid confusion."

The Mount Barnes of today, which was originally named "Mt. Childs" by that expedition, is situated three miles northwest of Mt. Wilder, and for whom Mt. Wilder is named is unknown.

Climate

Based on the Köppen climate classification, Mount Wilder is located in the marine west coast climate zone of western North America. Most weather fronts originate in the Pacific Ocean, and travel east toward the Olympic Mountains. As fronts approach, they are forced upward by the peaks of the Olympic Range, causing them to drop their moisture in the form of rain or snowfall (Orographic lift). As a result, the Olympics experience high precipitation, especially during the winter months. During winter months, weather is usually cloudy, but, due to high pressure systems over the Pacific Ocean that intensify during summer months, there is often little or no cloud cover during the summer. The months June through August offer the most favorable weather for viewing or climbing this mountain.

Geology

The Olympic Mountains are composed of obducted clastic wedge material and oceanic crust, primarily Eocene sandstone, turbidite, and basaltic oceanic crust. The mountains were sculpted during the Pleistocene era by erosion and glaciers advancing and retreating multiple times.

See also

 Olympic Mountains
 Geology of the Pacific Northwest

References

External links
 
 Weather forecast: Mount Wilder

Olympic Mountains
Mountains of Washington (state)
Mountains of Jefferson County, Washington
Landforms of Olympic National Park
North American 1000 m summits